La Casona is a community in the Ngäbe-Buglé indigenous territory of . The indigenous territory is located in the canton of the same name in Puntarenas Province, Costa Rica.

References

Populated places in Puntarenas Province